The Embassy of the United Kingdom in Budapest is the chief diplomatic mission of the United Kingdom in Hungary. 

The Embassy is located at Füge u. 5-7. in the Rózsadomb (District II) area of the city. 

The Embassy also represents the British Overseas Territories in Hungary.

See also
Hungary-United Kingdom relations
List of diplomatic missions in Hungary
List of Ambassadors of the United Kingdom to Hungary

References

Budapest
United Kingdom
Buildings and structures in Budapest
Hungary–United Kingdom relations